Daniel K. Winn (born June 19, 1966) is a Vietnamese-American artist, curator, and philanthropist.

Early life and education 
Winn was born in Biên Hoa, Vietnam and lived there until 1975 when his family escaped to California, during the Fall of Saigon. His family settled in Greater Los Angeles where Winn eventually attended the University of California, Irvine, earning a Bachelors of
Science. Winn then began medical school at the University of California, Irvine, School of Medicine with an intended focus in reconstructive surgery but left to pursue a career in art.

Career as curator and artist 
After leaving medical school, Winn began producing paintings and sculptures and opened a small frame shop and gallery in Southern California. By 1997, Winn owned galleries in Newport Beach and Laguna Beach. That same year he founded Masterpiece Publishing and spent the next 20 years mentoring and promoting artists, curating exhibitions throughout North America and China. During this time, Winn continued to refine his own style. Winn's sculptures and paintings have been exhibited in the United States, Spain, China, and Vietnam.

Winn's work has been compared to that of Salvador Dalí. In 2019, the Shanghai Art Museum held a joint exhibit featuring the works of Winn and Dalí.

Winn has raised over $2 million for charities in the US and Asia. In 2018, Winn was knighted by Prince Waldemar of Schaumburg-Lippe in recognition of his philanthropic works.

In 2021, Winn was commissioned to create five new award statuettes for the Asian World Film Festival including the new Snow Leopard Award, the Red Cross Tiffany Ladies Circle Courage to Dream Award, the Benefactor Award, the Winn-Slavin Humanitarian Award, and the One Heart Award.

Exhibitions 
 Art Miami-Context 2021
 Red Dot Miami, 2016
 La Art Show, 2017
 Art Marbella, 2017
 Shanghai Contemporary Art Fair, 2017
 Jane Kahan Gallery, 2017
 Intersect Palm Springs, 2017
 Coral Spring Museum of Art, 2018
 Shanghai Art Museum, 2019, 2020

Awards 

 2009 Asian Business Association of Orange County Entrepreneur of the Year
 2014 California Senate Resolution Recipient as a Publisher for Contemporary Arts
 2019 International Gold Medal, Best Sculpture. Grand Jury de Mondial Art Academia.
 2020 International Gold Medal, Best Painting. Grand Jury de Mondial Art Academia.
 2020 International Silver Medal, Best Sculpture. Grand Jury de Mondial Art Academia.

References

External links 
 Official Website
 Asian World Film Festival

Vietnamese artists
20th-century American sculptors
20th-century American painters
American artists of Vietnamese descent
American people of Vietnamese descent
1966 births
Living people
21st-century American painters
21st-century American sculptors